Lucky Cowboy is a 1944 American two-reel Western film directed by Josef Berne using a screenplay by Robert Stephen Brode. The film starred Eddie Dew, Julie Gibson, Bob Kortman, and LeRoy Mason.

External links
 

1944 films
1944 Western (genre) films
American Western (genre) films
Paramount Pictures short films
Films directed by Josef Berne
1940s American films